Fulton County is a county in the U.S. state of New York. It forms part of the state's Mohawk Valley region. Its county seat is Johnstown. At the 2020 U.S. census, the county had a population of 53,324. The county is named in honor of Robert Fulton, who is widely credited with developing the first commercially successful steamboat. Fulton County comprises the Gloversville micropolitan statistical area, which is included in the Capital District.

History

In 1838, Fulton County was split off from Montgomery, shortly after the Montgomery county seat was moved to Fonda, New York. The creation of Fulton County was engineered by Johnstown lawyer Daniel Cady, whose wife was a cousin of Robert Fulton.

The old Tryon County courthouse, built in 1772, later the Montgomery County courthouse, became the Fulton County Courthouse, where it is New York's oldest operating courthouse.

One adjustment has been made to the area of Fulton County. On April 6, 1860,  on the northern border was transferred to Hamilton in the vicinity of Sacandaga Park. This resulted in the Fulton County that exists today.

In the mid-18th century, Sir William Johnson, founder of Fort Johnson in Montgomery County and of Johnstown, arrived in what would become Fulton County. Sir William Johnson, 1st Baronet, was an Irish pioneer and army officer in colonial New York, and the British Superintendent of Indian Affairs from 1755 to 1774. His homes, Fort Johnson and Johnson Hall are current New York State Historic Sites.

Fulton County was also home to Elizabeth Cady Stanton, a central pioneer in America's women's rights movement.

Shortly after the American Revolutionary War, the manufacture of gloves and leather became the area's primary industry. At one point, Johnstown and Gloversville were known as the world's Glove and Leather capital. The largest rise in population and growth came as a result of the fruits of these businesses.

Many residents of Fulton County can trace their ancestry to the glove and leather trades. Today few glovers, tanners and leather dressers remain in the area, although some companies have adapted to the changes in the market to remain competitive.

Geography
Fulton County is in the central part of the state, northwest of Albany, lying in the southern Adirondack Mountains. Approximately 58% of the county is within the boundaries of Adirondack Park.

Adjacent counties
 Hamilton County - north
 Saratoga County - east
 Montgomery County - south
 Herkimer County - west

Demographics

The 2019 American Community Survey estimated there were 53,383 residents in the county, down from 55,531 at the 2010 United States Census. There were also an estimated 22,439 households, and 29,173 housing units at the 2019 population estimates. The racial makeup of Fulton County was 92.2% non-Hispanic white, 2.2% Black or African American, 0.3% American Indian or Alaska Native, 0.7% Asian American, 1.6% from two or more races, and 3.5% Hispanic or Latino of any race.

Roughly 72% of households were owner-occupied and the median gross rent was $759. There were 2.34 persons per household and 3.1% spoke a language other than English at home. Of the population there were 25.1% from ages 18 to 5 and under, and 20.1% aged 65 and older. The median income for a household in the county was $50,248, and the per capita income was $26,875. Roughly 13% of the county population lived at or below the poverty line.

At the census of 2000, there were 55,073 people, 21,884 households, and 14,509 families residing in the county. The population density was 111 people per square mile (43/km2). There were 27,787 housing units at an average density of 56 per square mile (22/km2). The racial makeup of the county was 95.99% White, 1.80% Black or African American, 0.19% Native American, 0.53% Asian, 0.02% Pacific Islander, 0.56% from other races, and 0.91% from two or more races.  1.61% of the population were Hispanic or Latino of any race. 17.2% were of Italian, 16.4% German, 13.2% Irish, 10.0% English, 8.3% American, 5.8% French and 5.7% Polish ancestry according to Census 2000. 96.1% spoke English and 1.6% Spanish as their first language.

There were 21,884 households, out of which 30.50% had children under the age of 18 living with them, 50.00% were married couples living together, 11.30% had a female householder with no husband present, and 33.70% were non-families. 27.70% of all households were made up of individuals, and 12.90% had someone living alone who was 65 years of age or older.  The average household size was 2.43 and the average family size was 2.94.

In the county, the population was spread out, with 24.90% under the age of 18, 7.20% from 18 to 24, 28.10% from 25 to 44, 23.60% from 45 to 64, and 16.30% who were 65 years of age or older.  The median age was 39 years. For every 100 females there were 97.10 males.  For every 100 females age 18 and over, there were 93.60 males.

The median income for a household in the county was $33,663, and the median income for a family was $39,801. Males had a median income of $29,538 versus $22,173 for females. The per capita income for the county was $16,844. About 9.20% of families and 12.50% of the population were below the poverty line, including 17.50% of those under age 18 and 7.50% of those age 65 or over.

2020 Census

Education
In 2019 the U.S. Census Bureau determined 87.4% of Fulton County's population obtained a high school degree or higher. Nearly 18% had a bachelor's degree or higher. Fulton–Montgomery Community College is in Johnstown, New York. It is a part of the State University of New York system.

Transportation

Airports 
The following public use airports are located in the county:
 Fulton County Airport (NY0) – Johnstown
 Dolgeville Airport (1F6) – Dolgeville

Communities

Cities
 Gloversville
 Johnstown (county seat)

Towns

 Bleecker
 Broadalbin
 Caroga
 Ephratah
 Johnstown
 Mayfield
 Northampton
 Oppenheim
 Perth
 Stratford

Villages
 Broadalbin
 Dolgeville
 Mayfield
 Northville

Census-designated place
 Caroga Lake

Hamlet
 Kingsboro

Politics

|}

Fulton County has historically been a stronghold for the Republican Party, with the cities of Johnstown and Gloversville being battlegrounds between Democrats and Republicans. The county was won by Donald Trump in 2016 at 64 percent.

See also

 List of counties in New York
 List of New York State Historic Markers in Fulton County, New York
 National Register of Historic Places listings in Fulton County, New York

References

Further reading

External links
 Fulton County Government Website
 "Glovers and Tanners of Fulton County"
 Fulton County Chamber of Commerce
 "Fulton-Montgomery Photo Archives
 "Fulton County Museum"
 

 
1838 establishments in New York (state)
Populated places established in 1838